St. Elmo Airport  is a public-use airport located two nautical miles (2.3 mi, 3.7 km) west of the central business district of St. Elmo, in Mobile County, Alabama, United States. It is included in the FAA's National Plan of Integrated Airport Systems for 2011–2015, which categorized it as a general aviation facility.

Facilities and aircraft 
It has one runway designated 6/24 with an asphalt surface measuring 3,998 by 80 feet (1,219 x 24 m).

For the 12-month period ending May 18, 2010, the airport had 20,400 general aviation aircraft operations, an average of 55 per day. At that time there were 31 aircraft based at this airport: 71% single-engine, 7% multi-engine, 3% jet, 3% helicopter and 16% ultralight.

World War II
During World War II, the airport was used as an auxiliary airfield for the Army contract flying school at Bates Army Airfield in Mobile.  The contract flying school operated between 1942 and 1944.

References

External links 
 

Airfields of the United States Army Air Forces in Alabama
Airports in Mobile County, Alabama